Osinki may refer to:
Osinki, Lublin Voivodeship (east Poland)
Osinki, Siemiatycze County in Podlaskie Voivodeship (north-east Poland)
Osinki, Suwałki County in Podlaskie Voivodeship (north-east Poland)
Osinki, Masovian Voivodeship (east-central Poland)
Osinki, Russia, name of several inhabited localities in Russia